William McHenry was an American politician and military leader.

Early life 
McHenry was born in Kentucky in 1771.

Career 
McHenry served as a lieutenant in Price's Battalion of Mounted Volunteers and participated at the Battle of Fallen Timbers in 1794, near modern Toledo, Ohio.

McHenry moved from Henderson County, Kentucky, in 1810. The family settled in what is now White County, Illinois, along the trail between the salt works near Old Shawneetown, Illinois, and Forts of Vincennes, Indiana.

In 1811, McHenry served in the Illinois Militia during Tecumseh's War, which culminated in the Battle of Tippecanoe in the Indiana territory. After the outbreak of the War of 1812, he participated in the attack on the Native American village at Peoria, which was allied with the British.

McHenry served as a major, leading the Mounted Spies, in the Black Hawk War in 1832. He became ill during the campaign.

Politics 
McHenry was elected to the 1st Illinois General Assembly and served until the end of the 5th.

McHenry was a delegate to the Illinois Constitutional Convention in 1818, and elected to the first Illinois House of Representatives. McHenry served as a member of the Illinois Senate from 1832 until his death in 1835.

Personal life 
He married Hannah Ruth Blackford in the late 1790s in Logan County, Kentucky.

McHenry died on February 3, 1835, in a boarding house in Vandalia, Illinois, which was then the location of the state capitol.

Legacy 
McHenry is the namesake of McHenry County and McHenry, Illinois, located in the northwest suburbs of Chicago.

References

External links
Major William McHenry

1770s births
1835 deaths
Members of the Illinois House of Representatives
Illinois state senators
American militiamen in the War of 1812